Ghaazee School is a  government school of Maldives, located in Hulhumale', Maldives. It is a unisex school that teaches male and female students to the primary as well as secondary level of education. English medium is followed in teaching with the exception of Dhivehi, Islam, Qur'an and Arabic.

The School was founded in 2007 and is still currently teaching students as of 2022 . Until recently, the School principal was Mariyam Mohamed. Currently, this post is empty and is temporarily filled in by the Deputy Principal, Moosa Adam.
The School teaches from LKG TO Grade 12.

School Motto 
The School Motto is Progress with Purpose.

Page text.

Subjects
English (All Grades)
Social Studies (Grade 1–8)
Dhivehi (All Grades)

Departments

English : Biju Joseph

References

Schools in the Maldives